Thank You is the second studio album by British recording artist Jamelia, released in the UK via Parlophone on 29 September 2003. Recording sessions for Thank You took place from mid-2002 until early 2003 and features production from a variety of record producers including, Colin Emmanuel, who produced the majority of the album, Cutfather, Soulshock, Peter Biker, Matt Kent and Cameron McVey, among others. It was shortlisted for the Mercury Prize in 2004. Thank You is Jamelia's best-selling album to date, with sales of over three million copies shipped worldwide.

Critical reception

Allmusic editor Jon O'Brien found that the album, "unlike countless other UK R&B albums, never forgets its roots, either [...] Overall, Thank You is a confident, imaginative record that oozes with personality and should be a lesson to record companies everywhere that patience can sometimes reap the biggest rewards." BBC critic Jaime Gill felt that Thank You "sees the vocalist take bold steps onto new musical ground. Indeed, Thank You is at its weakest when it is most generic [...] Given the success she is now enjoying, it seems likely that Jamelia's confidence and willingness to experiment can only grow. Her third album should be quite something."

Chart performance
In the United Kingdom, Thank You reached a new peak of number four following its re-release in March 2004, thus becoming Jamelia's highest charting album to date. It has since been certified platinum by the British Phonographic Industry (BPI) for sales in excess of 600,000 copies. Elsewhere, Thank You has reached the top twenty in New Zealand and the top forty in Ireland and Switzerland.

Singles
Thank You produced seven singles, all of which attained varying degrees of international chart success. "Bout" was released as the album's lead single in June 2003. It featured guest vocals from American rapper Rah Digga and reached the top forty in the UK. The follow-up single, "Superstar" became Jamelia's most successful single internationally to date, topping the charts in Australia and New Zealand. The title track was released as the album's third single in February 2004 and became Jamelia's highest charting single in the UK to date, peaking at number 2 on the UK Singles Chart.

Following the single's success, the album was re-released with two additional tracks (three including Jamelia's duet with Italian singer Tiziano Ferro on the single, "Universal Prayer", which was only included on international versions of the re-release). "See It in a Boy's Eyes" served as the first single from the re-release and as the album's fourth single overall. It was most successful in the United Kingdom, where it became Jamelia's third consecutive top five hit. "Universal Prayer", a duet with Italian singer Tiziano Ferro, served as the album's fifth single and became Jamelia's first number-one hit in Italy and Spain. The album's final two singles, "DJ" and "Stop!" were released jointly as a double a-side single and became Jamelia's fourth consecutive top ten hit in the United Kingdom.

Track listing

{{Track listing
| headline         = Japanese edition bonus tracks| title15          = Superstar
| note15           = Bob 'Reef' Tewlow Remix
| writer15         = 
| extra15          = 
| length15         = 
| title16          = Superstar
| note16           = Copenhanicas Remix
| writer16         = 
| extra16          = 
| length16         = 
| title17          = Superstar
| note17           = Ayo Supersar JD Remix
| writer17         = 
| extra17          = 
| length17         =
}}Sample credits'''
"Bout" samples Bill Conti's "Gonna Fly Now".

Charts

Weekly charts

Year-end charts

Certifications

References

2003 albums
Jamelia albums
Albums produced by Soulshock and Karlin